The following list of Gauleiters enumerates those who have held the Nazi party rank of Gauleiter, a type of regional party leader in Germany only within Adolf Hitler's system.

Of the 44 former Gauleiter of the NSDAP thirteen committed suicide when Nazi Germany surrendered, eight were executed by the allies after the war, one was executed by the SS and one died in Soviet captivity. By 1954, when Karl Wahl became the first former Gauleiter to publish his memoirs, eight were still missing, three in jail and the remaining ten were free men.

List
This is a list of Gaue and Gauleiters, with their time in office in brackets:

Notes

References

Inline

Bibliography
Miller, Michael D. and Schulz, Andreas (2012). Gauleiter: The Regional Leaders Of The Nazi Party And Their Deputies, 1925-1945 (Herbert Albreacht-H. Wilhelm Huttmann)-Volume 1, R. James Bender Publishing. 
 
Westermann, Großer Atlas zur Weltgeschichte

External links
Gauleiter Nuremberg War Crimes International Court
Luxemburg Gauleiter
WorldStatesmen - here Belgium
List of Bavarian Gauleiter 

Gauleiter
 
Gauleiter

pl:Gauleiter